The MG 151 (MG 151/15) was a German 15 mm aircraft-mounted autocannon produced by Waffenfabrik Mauser during World War II. Its 20mm variant, the 20 mm MG 151/20 cannon, was widely used on German Luftwaffe fighters, night fighters, fighter-bombers, bombers and ground-attack aircraft. Salvaged guns saw post-war use by other nations.

Development and wartime history (MG 151/20)
The pre-war German doctrine for arming single-engine fighter aircraft mirrored that of the French. This doctrine favoured a powerful autocannon mounted between the cylinder banks of a V engine and firing through the propeller hub, known as a moteur-canon in French (from its first use with the Hispano-Suiza HS.8C engine in World War I, on the SPAD S.XII) and by the cognate Motorkanone in German by the 1930s. The weapon preferred by the French in this role was the most powerful 20mm Oerlikon of the time, namely the FFS model, but this proved too big for German engines. Mauser was given the task of developing a gun that would fit, with a minimum sacrifice in performance. (As a stop-gap measure, the MG FF cannon was developed and put in widespread use, but its performance was lackluster.)

Production of the MG 151 in its original 15 mm calibre format began in 1940. After combat evaluation of the 15 mm cartridge as the main armament of early Messerschmitt Bf 109F-2 fighters, the cannon was redesigned as the 20 mm MG 151/20 in 1941 to fire a 20 mm cartridge. Combat experience showed that a more powerful explosive shell was preferable to a higher projectile velocity. The MG 151/20 cartridge was created by expanding the neck of the cartridge to hold the larger explosive shell used in the MG FF cannon, and shortening the length of the cartridge case holding the longer 20 mm shell to match the overall length of the original 15 mm cartridge. These measures simplified conversion of the 15 mm to the 20 mm MG 151/20, requiring only a change of barrel and other small modifications. With an AP projectile the new 20 mm cartridge could penetrate only around 10–12 mm of armor at 300 m and at 60 degrees, compared to 18 mm penetration for its 15 mm predecessor in the same conditions but this was not seen as a significant limitation. The 20 mm version thus became the standard inboard cannon from the Bf 109F-4 series. The 20 mm MG 151/20 offered more predictable trajectory, longer range and higher impact velocity than the  cartridge of the earlier MG FF cannon. The MG FF was retained for flexible, wing and upward firing Schräge Musik mounts to the end of the war.

The German preference for explosive power rather than armor penetration was taken further with the development of the mine shell, first introduced for the MG FF (in the Bf 109 E-4) and later introduced for the MG 151/20. Even this improvement in explosive power turned out to be unsatisfactory against the four-engine bombers that German fighters were up against in the second part of the war. By German calculations, it took about 15–20 hits with the MG 151/20 to down a heavy bomber but this was reduced to just 3–4 hits for a 30 mm shell, from the shattering effects of the hexogen explosive in the shells used for both the long-barreled MK 103 and shorter barreled MK 108 cannon. Only 4–5 hits with 20 mm calibre cannon were needed for frontal attacks on four-engined bombers but such attacks were difficult to execute. The 30 mm MK 108 cannon thus replaced the MG 151/20 as the standard, engine-mount  Motorkanone centre-line armament starting with the Bf 109 K-4 and was also retrofitted to some of the G-series.

Eight hundred MG 151/20 exported to Japan aboard the Italian submarine  in August 1943 were used to equip 388 Japanese Kawasaki Ki-61-I Hei fighters. The 20 mm MG 151/20 was also fitted on the Macchi C.205, the Fiat G.55 and Reggiane Re.2005 of the Regia Aeronautica and IAR 81B and 81C of the Romanian Royal Air Force.

An unknown number of cannons were converted for usage in the ground use role in early 1945, predominantly within Volkssturm units serving in the Posen area. Its effectiveness in this role are unknown but is photographed on parade in Posen November 1944 with the Wartheland Volkssturm units.

Postwar Use

After World War II, numbers of ex-Luftwaffe MG 151/20 cannon were removed from inventory and from scrapped aircraft and used by various nations in their own aircraft. The French Air Force (AdA) and French Army aviation arm (ALAT) used MG 151/20 cannon as fixed and flexible armament in various aircraft, including helicopters. The AdA and ALAT jointly developed a rubber-insulated flexible mount for the MG 151/20 for use as a door gun, which was later used in combat in Algeria aboard several FAF/ALAT H-21C assault transport helicopters and on Sikorsky HSS-1 Pirate gunship helicopters. French Matra MG 151 20mm cannons were used by Portugal and Rhodesia fitted to their Alouette III helicopters, while Denel designed its own variant for the South African Air Force.

Users

MG 151 applications 

 Dornier Do 17
 Dornier Do 217
 Fiat G.55
 Focke-Wulf Fw 190
 Focke-Wulf Ta 152
 Heinkel He 162
 Kawasaki Ki-61-I-Hei
 Macchi C.205
 Messerschmitt Bf 109
 Messerschmitt Bf 110
 Messerschmitt Me 163
 Messerschmitt Me 210
 Messerschmitt Me 410
 Reggiane Re.2001 CN
 Reggiane Re.2005
 SdKfz 251/21
 SNCASO SO.8000

MG 151/15 specifications
Type: single-barrel automatic cannon
Caliber: 15×96mm
Operation: Recoil-operated; short recoil
Length: 1916 mm
Barrel length: 1254 mm/83.6 calibers
Rifling: 8 grooves, right hand twist, 1 turn in 16"
Weight (complete): 38.1 kg (84 lb)
Rate of fire: 740 rpm
Effective range: 1000 m
Muzzle velocity: 850 m/s (AP-T); 960 m/s (HE-T, HEI-T); 1030 m/s AP(WC)
Projectile types:
AP-T weighing 72 g
HE weighing 57 g. HE filler: 2.8 g
AP(WC) weighing 52 g

MG 151/20 specifications
Two versions of the 20 mm MG 151 were built.  Early guns used a percussion priming system, and later E-models used electrical priming. Some rounds were available with a timer self-destruct and/or tracer (or glowtracer). There were also different types of high-explosive shell fillings with either standard Pentrit A (PETN + Aluminium), a mixture called HA 41 (RDX + Aluminium powder)(the latter had a 40 percent increased high explosive and incendiary effect), and a compressed version where more explosives (HA 41) were compressed into same space using large pressures (MX).

Type: single-barrel automatic cannon
Caliber: 20×82mm
Operation: Recoil-operated; short recoil
Length: 1766 mm
Barrel length: 1104 mm/55 calibers
Rifling: 1 turn in 23 calibers
Weight (complete): 42.7 kg (94.1 lbs)
Rate of fire: 750 rpm
Effective range:800 m
Muzzle velocity: 805 m/s (M-Geschoss); 705 m/s (HE-T, AP)
Round types:

Ammunition specifications

US derivative
During World War II the US Army produced the .60-caliber T17, a reverse-engineered copy of the German MG 151 chambered for an experimental anti-tank rifle round. A speculative order of 5,000 T17 guns was placed but only around 300 of them were built. However none saw service despite the availability of 6 million rounds of .60 caliber ammunition. Almost one million rounds were fired during the T17 testing program. Further refinements led to the T39 and T51 versions, but these also did not enter service.

Ammunition
A cartridge originally based on an armor-piercing round designed in 1939 for use with the experimental T1 and T1E1 anti-tank rifles. It was cancelled in 1944 when it became clear that modern tanks had armor too thick to penetrate with a heavy rifle cartridge. Developments showed that shaped-charged rifle grenades and rocket launchers were the future of infantry anti-tank weapons and the anti-tank rifle concept was abandoned.

Much like the British attempts to turn their stocks of obsolete .55 Boys anti-tank cartridges into a native-designed heavy machinegun cartridge, the .60-caliber cartridge was repurposed as an auto-cannon cartridge to succeed the older .50 Browning. The ammunition and the T17 cannon were produced from 1942 to 1946 but never proved a substantial improvement over the .50 Browning and the M2HB and M3 heavy machineguns. The cartridge was later shortened and necked-up to produce the 20x102mm Vulcan autocannon round.
  
.60 Armor-Piercing (15.2 x 114mm T1E1) - A 1180 grain (76.5 gram) kinetic penetrator projectile with a velocity of 3,600 feet per second (1,100 m/s) for a muzzle energy of over 34,000 ft./lbs. (46 kilojoules).
.60 T32 Ball (15.2 x 114mm T17)

See also
 List of weapons of military aircraft of Germany during World War II
 MK 108 30 mm cannon
 MG 131 13 mm heavy machine gun
 MG 17 7.92 mm machine gun

References

Bibliography

Further reading

External links

Autocannon
Aircraft guns
20 mm artillery
World War II machine guns
World War II artillery of Germany
Weapons and ammunition introduced in 1940